Morniflumate is a nonsteroidal anti-inflammatory drug (NSAID).

References 

Aminopyridines
Anilines
4-Morpholinyl compunds
Nicotinate esters
Trifluoromethyl compounds